Alternariosis is an infection by Alternaria, presenting cutaneously as focal, ulcerated papules and plaques.

Treatment with itraconazole has been reported.

See also 
 Skin lesion

References

External links 

Mycosis-related cutaneous conditions